Petre Sebeşanu Aurelian, 13 December 1833 – 24 January 1909,  was a Romanian economist, politician and academic. A member of the National Liberal Party (PNL), he served as a Prime Minister of Romania between 2 December 1896 and 12 April 1897.

Born in Slatina on 13 December 1833, he studied at Saint Sava College, Bucharest and then in France at the Superior School of Agronomy of Grignon, where he studied between 1856 and 1860. After he returned to Romania, he became an engineer at the Public Works Ministry and a professor at the Agriculture School of Pantelimon, as well as an editor at the "Monitorul" and "Agronomia" publications.

He was a deputy, a senator, the minister of Public Works (1877–1878 and 1887–1888), of agriculture and of Education (1882–1884).

Aurelian was elected as member of the Romanian Academy in 1871 and was its president between 1896 and 1897. He died in Bucharest on 24 January 1909.

1833 births
1909 deaths
People from Slatina, Romania
People of the Principality of Wallachia
National Liberal Party (Romania) politicians
Prime Ministers of Romania
Romanian Ministers of Agriculture
Romanian Ministers of Culture
Romanian Ministers of Education
Romanian Ministers of Foreign Affairs
Romanian Ministers of Interior
Romanian Ministers of Public Works
Presidents of the Chamber of Deputies (Romania)
Members of the Chamber of Deputies (Romania)
Presidents of the Senate of Romania
Members of the Senate of Romania
Mayors of Bucharest
Presidents of the Romanian Academy
Romanian expatriates in France
Saint Sava National College alumni